Sultanuzzaman Md Saleh Uddin OSB, SGP, ndc is a Major General of Bangladesh Army and the managing director of Bangladesh Machine Tools Factory. He is known for overseeing the launch of smart national identity cards in Bangladesh.

Career 
Uddin served as the Director General of the NID Registration Wings of Bangladesh Election Commission. He oversaw the issuing of smart identity cards in Bangladesh.

Uddin, as the managing director of Bangladesh Machine Tools Factory, announced plans to build ventilators at the factory during the COVID-19 pandemic in Bangladesh.

References 

Living people
Bangladesh Army generals
Year of birth missing (living people)